The fifteenth season of The Bachelorette premiered on May 13, 2019. This season features Hannah Brown, a 24-year-old interior designer from Tuscaloosa, Alabama. Brown was crowned Miss Alabama USA 2018 and represented Alabama at Miss USA 2018.

Brown finished in seventh place on season 23 of The Bachelor featuring Colton Underwood. She is the first Bachelorette lead to not have placed in the top four of a season of The Bachelor, and is the youngest bachelorette in the show's history.

The season concluded on July 30, 2019, with Brown accepting a proposal from 25-year-old singer/songwriter Jed Wyatt. However, during the After The Final Rose special, it was revealed that they called off their engagement in June 2019 after Brown discovered that Wyatt had a girlfriend at home during filming. Wyatt also admitted that he only went on the show to promote his music career.

Production

Casting and contestants
Hannah Brown was named as the Bachelorette during the After the Final Rose special of the 23rd season of The Bachelor on March 12, 2019. During the live finale of the latter season, Brown met the first five contestants: Luke P., Cam, Dustin, Connor and Luke S.

Notable contestants include Connor Jenkins, the son of former WGN News and FOX News Chicago anchor Nancy Loo; and Daron Blaylock, the son of retired NBA basketball player Mookie Blaylock.

Filming and development
Filming began on March 16, 2019 at The Bachelor Mansion. On March 21, filming was first spotted at Newport, Rhode Island and several reports are seen filming in Boston, Massachusetts a week later. Production crews have also reported in Inverness, Scotland, United Kingdom at MacGregor's Bar nestling over River Ness and Gouda and The Hague in the Netherlands. In addition to them, the season will also include visits in Latvia and Greece. The visit in Latvia marks the first time in a major U.S.-based television or film production to take place in the country and a first visit in the former Soviet Union for the whole Bachelor Nation franchise.

Appearances for this season are runway model J. Alexander, RuPaul's Drag Race drag queens Alyssa Edwards and Alaska, actors Jason Biggs and Jenny Mollen, Danish pop band Lukas Graham, American country singer Jake Owen and Boston Celtics basketball players Jaylen Brown and Terry Rozier.

Contestants

33 potential contestants were revealed on March 14, 2019.

The final cast of 30 men was announced on May 7, 2019.

Future appearances

The Bachelor

Peter Weber was chosen as the lead for season 24 of The Bachelor. Additionally, Brown appeared in two episodes during season 24, and Tyler Cameron also appeared in one episode of season 25.

Bachelor in Paradise
Season 6

Cam Ayala, Kevin Fortenberry, John Paul Jones, Dylan Barbour, Connor Saeli, Mike Johnson, Matt Donald, and Luke Stone competed in season 6 of Bachelor in Paradise. Brown also made an appearance to give advice to fellow season 23 contestant, Demi Burnett. Ayala and Fortenberry were eliminated during week 2. Johnson was eliminated during week 4. Saeli quit during week 5. Stone was eliminated during week 5. Donald and John Paul Jones split from Bri Barnes and Tayshia Adams, respectively, during week 6.

Dancing with the Stars
Season 28

Brown competed in and won season 28 of Dancing With the Stars.

Call-out order

 The contestant received a special first impression rose
 The contestant received Hannah's first impression rose
 The contestant received a rose outside of a rose ceremony or date
 The contestant received a rose during a date
 The contestant was eliminated
 The contestant was eliminated during a date
 The contestant was eliminated outside the rose ceremony
 The contestant was disqualified from the competition
 The contestant quit the competition
 The contestant won the competition

Episodes

Controversy
On June 18, 2019, People released a story that contestant Jed Wyatt was in a relationship with Nashville musician Haley Stevens before and during filming of the season. Stevens stated that Wyatt promised her he was going on the show purely to further his music career, that he did not intend to begin a relationship with Brown, and any appearance of him pursuing Hannah Brown was simply "acting". Fans felt that Stevens' accusations had merit as Wyatt had performed several of his own written songs for Brown throughout his time on the show. She additionally published letters that Wyatt wrote to her, where he stated how someday she would be thankful that he did this. In the first episode, Brown had eliminated contestant Scott Andersen before the first rose ceremony after she was informed that Andersen still had a girlfriend back home. Ultimately, the news of Wyatt's relationship prior to the show caused Brown to end her engagement with him.

Notes

References

External links

2019 American television seasons
The Bachelorette (American TV series) seasons
Television shows filmed in California
Television shows filmed in Rhode Island
Television shows filmed in Boston
Television shows filmed in Scotland
Television shows filmed in Latvia
Television shows filmed in the Netherlands
Television shows filmed in Florida
Television shows filmed in Georgia (U.S. state)
Television shows filmed in Tennessee
Television shows filmed in Greece